The 2018–19 FA Women's Championship was the first rebranded edition of the FA Women's Championship, the second tier of women's football in England, renamed from the FA WSL 2 which was founded in 2014. The season ran from 8 September 2018 to 12 May 2019.

On 20 April 2019, Manchester United won the title, and promotion to the FA WSL, with two games to spare in their debut season after recording a 7–0 victory over Crystal Palace. Tottenham Hotspur subsequently secured second place and promotion following a 1–1 draw at Aston Villa in their penultimate fixture. Millwall Lionesses finished bottom but were spared relegation as the FA sought to expand both of the top two divisions to twelve teams each by 2019–20.

Teams
Eleven teams compete in the league. Following restructuring of the women's game in order to provide for a fully professional Women's Super League (WSL), membership of both the first and second tier is subject to a license, based on a series of off-the-field criteria. Existing WSL teams were first offered the opportunity to bid for licenses, with all applying FA WSL 2 clubs retaining their place in the second tier, except for Brighton & Hove Albion who were offered a place in the WSL. From the second tier, Oxford United and Watford did not apply for licenses.

This left up to two places in the WSL and up to five places in the Championship for applying clubs, of which one place in the Championship was reserved for the winners of the FA Women's Premier League Championship play-off, providing that club met the licensing criteria. Fifteen applications were received for both the top two tiers, and five of these applicants were accepted into the Championship: Manchester United, Lewes, Leicester City Women, Sheffield United as well as Premiership play-off winners, Charlton Athletic.

Sheffield announced on 24 June 2018 that it was withdrawing from the league ahead of the season, due to the financial commitments required by The Football Association proving too onerous. Doncaster Rovers Belles announced similarly on 12 July 2018. A place in the league was subsequently awarded to Crystal Palace.

Table
For the inaugural season, the top two teams will be automatically promoted subject to obtaining a licence. There will be no relegation at the end of the campaign with a view to expanding the top two tiers to twelve teams each by 2019–20.

Results

Top goalscorers

Awards

Player of the Month
Results of Player of the Month voting as polled by FA Women's Championship. Number of nominations in brackets.

LMA Manager of the Month 
Results of Manager of the Month as awarded by the League Managers Association. Number of awards in brackets.

See also
2018–19 FA WSL Cup
2018–19 FA WSL (tier 1)
2018–19 FA Women's National League (tier 3)

References

External links
Official website

Women's Championship (England)
2
2018–19 domestic women's association football leagues